Life Science Park station is a station on the Changping Line of the Beijing Subway.

Station Layout 
The station has an elevated island platform.

Exits 
There are 2 exits, lettered A and B. Exit B is accessible.

References

External links

Beijing Subway stations in Changping District
Railway stations in China opened in 2010